The 2021–22 Northern Illinois Huskies men's basketball team represented Northern Illinois University in the 2021–22 NCAA Division I men's basketball season. The Huskies were led by first-year head coach Rashon Burno, played their home games at the Convocation Center in DeKalb, Illinois as members of the Mid-American Conference. They finished the season 9–21, 6–14 in MAC play to finish a tie for ninth place. They failed to qualify for the MAC tournament.

Previous season
In a season limited due to the ongoing COVID-19 pandemic, the Huskies finished the 2020–21 season 3–16, 2–12 in MAC play to finish in last place. They failed to qualify for the MAC tournament which had been limited to provide that the bottom four finishers would not be eligible. The MAC also announced the removal of divisions in cost-cutting measure partly attributed to COVID-19.

On January 3, 2021, it was announced that head coach Mark Montgomery had been relieved of his duties after the team's 1–7 start to the season. Associate head coach Lamar Chapman was named interim head coach for the remainder of the season. On March 6, the school named Arizona State assistant Rashon Burno the new head coach.

Roster

Schedule and results 

|-
!colspan=12 style=| Exhibition

|-
!colspan=12 style=| Non-conference regular season

|-
!colspan=12 style=| MAC regular season

|-

References

Northern Illinois Huskies men's basketball seasons
Northern Illinois Huskies
Northern Illinois Huskies men's basketball
Northern Illinois Huskies men's basketball